Nicoleta Lucia Luciu (born 12 September 1980, Bucharest) is a Romanian actress, singer and television host.

After she won the Miss Romania contest in 1999, she began to appear in different magazines: Playboy, Iveco, Vivre, Pro TV Magazin, TV Mania etc. In 2012, she became a co-presenter of The Voice of Romania.

In 2014 Warner Bros Animation chose the celebrity to dubbed in Romanian Wonder Woman in the animated movie The Lego Movie.

References

External links
 www.nicoletaluciu.ro - Site web official
 Filmografie CineMagia
 Scurtă biografie, desprevedete.ro
 Poze cu Nicoleta Luciu, DLH.ro

Romanian actresses
Living people
Romanian television personalities
1980 births
Romanian beauty pageant winners